= USSU =

USSU may refer to:

- University of Salford Students' Union
- University of Surrey Students' Union
